Tantia Bhīl (or Tantya Bheel,  Tundra or Tandra, Tantya Mama; 1842 – 4 December 1889) was a freedom fighter active in India between 1878 and 1889. He is described very negatively as a criminal in the British-era accounts, but is recognized by Indians as a heroic figure. Accounts of both eras have described him as an "Indian Robin Hood".

Life
Tantia was born in an Indian tribal Bhil community at the Pandhana village in Nimar district of Nagpur Kingdom in around 1842. As per one modern account, he embarked on his way of life after the harsh measures taken by the British following the Indian Rebellion of 1857. Tantia was first arrested around 1874 for "bad livelihood" and after a year's sentence turned to more serious crimes of theft and kidnapping. He was arrested for the second time in 1878 by Haji Nasrullah Khan Yousufzai (British army officer) and jailed at Khandwa, escaping after only three days, and from there took up his life as a dacoit which money used for local community. Money originally looted by British in India.

Tantia was lured to a parley by an officer of the Indore army who promised him a pardon, but was ambushed and taken to Jubbulpore where he was tried and hanged on 4 December 1889.

History
It is an indisputable fact that freedom fighters have all along been termed as rebels by the powers that be it the Mughal Empire of Aurangzeb or the British rule. Tantya Bhil was one of the greatest revolutionaries who waged an armed struggle against the British rule for twelve years and endeared himself to the masses by virtue of his indomitable courage and passion to uproot the foreign rule. Political parties and educated class launched forceful movement for ending the British Rule. But much before these movements, tribal communities and revolutionary like Tantya Bhil raised a banner of revolt against the British rule. Tantya Bhil became a symbol of the feelings of tribals and general people.

About one hundred twenty years ago Tantya Bhil emerged as a great hero of the masses and became since then a long cherished pride of Bhil tribe. He epitomized the indomitable courage, exceptional agility and organizing skill.

Tantya Bhil used to plunder the government treasuries of the British government and wealth of their sycophants used to distribute it among the poor and needy. In fact, he was the Messiah of the have-nots. He was popularly called Mama by people of all age groups. This address of Tantya became so popular that the Bhils still feel proud in being addressed as "Mama". He used to reach out to those who were in need of financial help in a miraculous manner.

The news of the arrest of Tantya Bhil was prominently published in the 10 November 1889 issue of the New York Times. In this news he was described as the "Robin Hood of India".

He wanted to teach a lesson to the British and to realize Bhils’ dream of socialist society. He was fired with a passion to free India from British subjugation. He broke the jail many times.

He was skilful in guerrilla warfare. He was also a great shooter and proficient in traditional archery. "Daava" or Falia was his main weapon. He had also learnt to handle gun.

Right from his young age, he lived in dense forests, valleys, ravines and mountains all his life measuring swords with the British and Holkar State's armies. He inflected reverses on the police of mighty British Empire and eluded them for many years. Thousands of people were arrested and hundreds of them were thrown behind bars on the charge of helping Tantya.

Ultimately, Tantya was arrested due to treachery of Ganpat, the husband of his formal sister. He was kept in the Central India Agency Jail in the British Residency area at Indore. Later, he was taken to Jubbulpore under strict police guard. He was heavily chained and kept in Jubbulpore jail where the British officers tortured him inhumanly. All types of atrocities were perpetrated on him. The Sessions Court, Jubbulpore sentenced him to be hanged till death on 19 October 1889.

The British government was scared about the breaking out of a Bhil rebellion. It is generally believed that after hanging him his body was thrown near Patalpani railway station on Khandwa rail route near Indore. The spot where his wooden effigies were placed is considered to be the Samadhi of Tantya Mama. Even today all the train drivers stop the train for a moment as a mark of respect to Tantya Mama.

Coverage in Raj media
An 1891 article on rhinoplasty in The Lancet presented a Maratha Brahmin patient whose nose was restored after having been cut off by Tantia Bhil shortly before his capture, and remarked Tantia's surprise, when confronted with the Brahmin whose nose had been restored before he entered the witness-box, was very amusing.

Filmography
Tantya Bheel (2012)

Further reading
Sher-i-Nimar Tantiya Bhil. S. Tadwal, Adivasi Ekta Parishad, 2000
The Bhil kills. S. C. Varma, Kunj Pub. House, 1978

References

People executed by British India by hanging
People from Khandwa district
People from Jabalpur
Indian independence activists from Madhya Pradesh
Indian outlaws
Indian robbers
Bhil people
1844 births
1890 deaths